Reza Davari Ardakani (born 6 July 1933, in Ardakan) is an Iranian philosopher who was influenced by Martin Heidegger, and a distinguished emeritus professor of philosophy at the University of Tehran. He is also the current president of the Iranian Academy of Sciences. He is known for his works on criticism of the Western Culture and thought.

Life
Davari received primary and secondary education in Arkadan, and after leaving school became a teacher in 1951. In 1954, he entered the University of Tehran as an undergraduate, gaining a BA and in 1967 a PhD in philosophy there. He is currently a professor of philosophy at Tehran University. From 1979 to 1981, he was dean at the faculty of literature and humanities, University of Tehran, and the head of Iranian National Commission for UNESCO from 1979 to 1982. Davari was the editor-in-chief of Farhang Journal.

Davari and Abdolkarim Soroush have engaged in a series of philosophical debates in post-revolutionary Iran.

See also 
Intellectual movements in Iran

References

External links

 Reza Davari Ardakani's official website

People from Ardakan
University of Tehran alumni
Academic staff of the University of Tehran
1933 births
Living people
Academic staff of the Islamic Azad University
Heidegger scholars
Philosophy academics
Existentialists
20th-century Iranian philosophers
21st-century Iranian philosophers
Philosophers of culture
Continental philosophers
Phenomenologists
Philosophers of nihilism
Recipients of the Order of Knowledge
Farabi scholars
Iranian Science and Culture Hall of Fame recipients in Philosophy
Faculty of Letters and Humanities of the University of Tehran alumni
Academy of Sciences of Iran members
Distinguished professors in Iran
Distinguished professors of philosophy